is an action-adventure / action role-playing game for the Super Famicom. Although the game was scheduled for release in the United States as The Journey Home: Quest for the Throne, in November 1993, the project was cancelled.

Gameplay
Duke, the main character, fights in real-time battles on his quest to save Neugier. He can jump and equip armor in an RPG fashion. There is also an ability to push objects, or enemies, into a wall to break them.

Reception
Upon release, GameFans four reviewers gave the game scores of 86%, 79%, 77% and 72%. They praised the action gameplay, creative game mechanics, graphics, and music, but criticized it for being short and easy. They concluded that it is "a good game, but could have been better."

References

External links

 Neugier: Umi to Kaze no Kodō at superfamicom.org
 Neugier - The Journey Home at superfamicom.org
 ノイギーア 〜海と風の鼓動〜 / Neugier: Umi to Kaze no Kodō at super-famicom.jp 
 Neugier: Umi to Kaze no Kodō composer information at SNES Music

1993 video games
Adventure games
Fantasy video games
Fantasy video games set in the Middle Ages
Japan-exclusive video games
Single-player video games
Super Nintendo Entertainment System games
Super Nintendo Entertainment System-only games
Telenet Japan games
Video games developed in Japan
Wolf Team games